Slieve Coillte is a hill in the south of County Wexford, Ireland.

Villages around Slieve Coillte include New Ross, Slaught, Cassagh, Gusserane, Campile, Ramsgrange and Duncannon. On a good day the whole of the Hook peninsula can be overseen, up to the 12th Century Hook lighthouse on Hook Head, one of the oldest operational lighthouses in the world.

Hillwalking
Slieve Coillte is popular with hillwalkers, with thousands of people climbing the mountain every year. A  road leads to a viewpoint on the summit. The road is accessible by car, so the view from Slieve Coillte can also be enjoyed without a walk to the top. Starting from the viewpoint is a  circular track that is also suitable for inexperienced walkers.

History
At the summit there is also a Rebellion memorial stone that states: "The rebels camped on Slieve Coillte from the 7th to 10th June. Bagenal Harvey resigned his command here. He was succeeded by Fr Philip Roche. A detachment under the command of Thomas Cloney attacked the gunboats on the river Barrow at Fisherstown." Slieve Coillte was picked because of the excellent view of the other camps in Wexford such as Lacken Hill, Carrigbyrne Hill, Forth Mountain and Oulart Hill.

Mythology
Slieve Coillte is alleged to play a role in Irish mythology. The hill outside New Ross is Ireland's Mount Ararat where the first invasion of Ireland took place in 2242 B.C. when Cessair the granddaughter of Noah, escaping the flood, made the first incursion or invasion into Ireland.

References

Landscape
Mountains and hills of County Wexford
Highest points of Irish counties
Locations in Celtic mythology